In enzymology, a glucosamine-6-phosphate deaminase is an enzyme that catalyzes the chemical reaction

D-glucosamine 6-phosphate + H2O  D-fructose 6-phosphate + NH3

Thus, the two substrates of this enzyme are glucosamine 6-phosphate and H2O, whereas its two products are fructose 6-phosphate and NH3.

This enzyme belongs to the family of hydrolases, those acting on carbon-nitrogen bonds other than peptide bonds, specifically in compounds that have not been otherwise categorized within EC number 3.5.  The systematic name of this enzyme class is 2-amino-2-deoxy-D-glucose-6-phosphate aminohydrolase (ketol isomerizing). Other names in common use include glucosaminephosphate isomerase, glucosamine-6-phosphate isomerase, phosphoglucosaminisomerase, glucosamine phosphate deaminase, aminodeoxyglucosephosphate isomerase, and phosphoglucosamine isomerase.  This enzyme participates in aminosugars metabolism.  This enzyme has at least one effector, N-Acetyl-D-glucosamine 6-phosphate.

Structural studies

References

 
 
 

EC 3.5.99
Enzymes of known structure